Ellert Sölvason  (17 December 1917 - 8 March 2002) was an Icelandic footballer. He was part of the Iceland national football team between 1946 and 1949. He played 4 matches. On club level he played for Valur and was the topsocerer of the 1942 Úrvalsdeild with six goals.

See also
 List of Iceland international footballers

References

External links
 

Ellert Solvason
Ellert Solvason
Ellert Solvason
1917 births
2002 deaths
Association footballers not categorized by position